Wonderstruck is a 2017 American mystery drama film directed by Todd Haynes and based on the 2011 novel Wonderstruck by Brian Selznick, who also adapted the novel into a screenplay. The film stars Oakes Fegley, Julianne Moore, Michelle Williams, and Millicent Simmonds.

The film premiered at the 2017 Cannes Film Festival on May 18, 2017, and competed for the Palme d'Or. It was given a limited release in the United States by Amazon Studios and Roadside Attractions on October 20, 2017.

Premise
The film interlaces two stories set fifty years apart, switching frequently between them, with the older storyline filmed in black and white. Each tells the story of a child's quest. In 1927, young deaf girl Rose runs away from her father's New Jersey home to find her mother/idol, the actress Lillian Mayhew. In 1977, recently orphaned Ben, made deaf by a freak accident, runs away from his Minnesota home in search of his father.

Cast
Oakes Fegley as Ben
Julianne Moore as Lillian Mayhew / Older Rose
Michelle Williams as Elaine Wilson
Millicent Simmonds as Rose
Jaden Michael as Jamie
Raul Torres as Jamie's father
Murphy Guyer as Security Chief 
Tom Noonan as Older Walter
Cory Michael Smith as Walter
James Urbaniak as Dr. Kincaid, Rose's father
Amy Hargreaves as Aunt Jenny
Damian Young as Otto
 Morgan Turner as Janet
 Lauren Ridloff as Pearl, The Maid

Production
Todd Haynes directed Wonderstruck based on an adapted screenplay by Brian Selznick, who also wrote the novel of the same name. Haynes was involved as director by May 2015 with Christine Vachon producing under her Killer Films banner. Haynes said his previous films had mostly been period films and that Wonderstrucks double-period premise, set in the 1920s and the 1970s, intrigued him. The director also considered the story "a classic mystery" in learning why two stories are being told and how they would connect. He saw it as a family film and as an opportunity to make a film about children that children could also see.

In November 2015, Julianne Moore had been cast in the film, with Pamela Koffler and John Sloss joining as producers. In April 2016, Jaden Michael, Cory Michael Smith, Michelle Williams, Oakes Fegley, and Amy Hargreaves joined the cast of the film. In May 2016, James Urbaniak joined the cast. Among those cast was Millicent Simmonds, a deaf actor from Utah. Haynes said they wanted to cast a deaf actor since deafness was integral to the two stories and the driving theme in the film. He instructed his casting director Laura Rosenthal to seek out deaf children around the country and if they could not find someone, they would cast a hearing child. They sought out deaf communities and received audition tapes from 200 deaf children. Simmonds was cast, and on set, she worked with American Sign Language interpreter Lynette Taylor.

Principal photography began on May 4, 2016. Filming took place in Peekskill, New York. Production concluded on July 3, 2016. The 1927 scenes were filmed in black and white in 35-negative anamorphic, which differs from the aspect ratio of silent films. Haynes, who was a fan of silent film directors F.W. Murnau and King Vidor, watched numerous silent films and observed that there was a wide range of styles that disappeared when sound technology made cameras too bulky to move easily. In Wonderstruck, the black-and-white scenes have a near-continuous musical soundtrack and use some design features that Haynes said were "not naturalistic or literal". The 1977 scenes were filmed with color-negative film in a way that matched the visual language of films from the 1970s, and also had "a gritty urban color" like the films Midnight Cowboy (1969) and The French Connection (1971). Both parts were filmed by cinematographer Edward Lachman.

Release
Amazon Studios and Roadside Attractions distributed the film. Amazon Studios partnered with Roadside to distribute Wonderstruck in the United States. It had its world premiere on May 18, 2017 at the 2017 Cannes Film Festival, where it competed for the Palme d'Or in the main competition section.

It also screened at the New York Film Festival on October 7, 2017.

Reception

Box office
Wonderstruck has grossed $1 million in the United States and Canada, and $2.2 million in other territories, for a worldwide total of $3.3 million.

Critical response
Wonderstruck was met with a three-minute standing ovation following its premiere at the 2017 Cannes Film Festival. On review aggregator Rotten Tomatoes, the film holds an approval rating of 68% based on 228 reviews, with an average rating of 6.70/10. The website's critical consensus reads, "Wonderstrucks efforts to juggle timelines and tonal shifts aren't always smooth, but the end result still adds up to an emotional journey whose visual thrills live up to its title." On Metacritic, the film has a weighted average score of 71 out of 100, based on 44 critics, indicating "generally favorable reviews".

David Rooney of The Hollywood Reporter gave the film a positive review writing: "Alive with the magic of pictures and the mysteries of silence, this is an uncommonly grownup film about children, communication, connection and memory." David Ehrlich of IndieWire also gave the film a positive review writing:  "A soul-stirring and fiercely uncynical film."

Accolades

See also

List of films featuring the deaf and hearing impaired.

References

External links

2017 films
2017 drama films
American drama films
American independent films
Films about deaf people
Films based on American novels
Films set in 1927
Films set in 1977
Films set in Hudson County, New Jersey
Films set in Manhattan
Films set in Minnesota
Films shot in New York City
Films scored by Carter Burwell
Films directed by Todd Haynes
Films produced by Christine Vachon
FilmNation Entertainment films
Killer Films films
2017 independent films
2010s English-language films
2010s American films